Kurota (Korotı) is a rural locality (a selo) in Ongudaysky District, the Altai Republic, Russia. The population was 346 as of 2016. There are 4 streets.

Geography 
Kurota is located 15 km northwest of Onguday (the district's administrative centre) by road. Karakol is the nearest rural locality.

References 

Rural localities in Ongudaysky District